Maria Carneiro Pereira Gomes (19 August 1875 – 14 August 1925) was the Brazilian first lady between 1914 and 1918 and the second lady between 1910 and 1914.

Sources

 family
 Brasil Verdade

References

1875 births
1925 deaths
First ladies of Brazil
Second ladies of Brazil